Barton Villa, at 11245 Nevada St. in Redlands, California, is a historic Second Empire house that is listed on the National Register of Historic Places.  It was built as a vernacular house during 1866–67, was renovated to Greek Revival c. 1871–72, and renovated again into Second Empire style in 1893.  It was the first fired-brick house built in Redlands (and the second in all of San Bernardino County, California), and is the oldest surviving house in Redlands. When it was NRHP-listed, it was the only Second Empire house in Redlands.

Also known as Barton House and as Barton Ranch, it was listed on the National Register of Historic Places in 1996;  the listing included two contributing buildings.  It was deemed significant for association with Dr. Ben Barton, early settler (of "Anglos") and large landowner.

References 

Houses in San Bernardino County, California
Buildings and structures in Redlands, California
Houses completed in 1867
Houses on the National Register of Historic Places in California
National Register of Historic Places in San Bernardino County, California
Second Empire architecture in California
History of Redlands, California